Fort Machault was a fort built by the French in 1754 near the confluence of French Creek with the Allegheny River, in northwest Pennsylvania. (Present-day Franklin developed here later.) The fort helped the French control these waterways, part of what was known as the Venango Path from Lake Erie to the Ohio River. 

It was one of four forts designed to protect French access to the Ohio Country and connections between its northern and southern colonies. From north to south the forts were Fort Presque Isle (at Lake Erie), Fort Le Boeuf (at the south end of the portage leading to the head of French Creek), Fort Machault (at the confluence noted), and Fort Duquesne, at the Forks of the Ohio.

Description
The fort was built on a hill, 60 yards west of the Allegheny River. The curtain was made of hewed timber, stacked lengthwise. The four corners had bastions in the form of polygons. The gate fronted the river. Inside the fort were a magazine, and several officer's barracks, built in two stories with stone chimneys. The soldiers' barracks consisted of 45 buildings outside the fort.

History

Establishment

In 1753, Governor Jean de Lauson ordered construction of a fortified trading post at the confluence of the Allegheny River and French Creek at Venango, a Lenape village. That year, the French expelled English traders from Venango, and Captain Philippe-Thomas Chabert de Joncaire established Fort d'Anjou with a permanent garrison at the location. This was one of four forts intended to protect French access to waterways connecting the Great Lakes and Ohio River, and ultimately the Mississippi River; they had colonies in each region.

Captain Joncaire was replaced in 1754 by Michel Maray de La Chauvignerie as the officer in charge of constructing the fort, which eventually was named Fort Machault. It was named in honor of prominent financier, Jean-Baptiste Machault d'Arnouville, the French Minister of the Marine at the time of its construction. It was also known as "Venango," the name of the nearby Delaware (Lenape) village. La Chauvignerie's construction efforts were set back by shortages of manpower and wood, resulting in sporadic construction. Improvements continued until November 1758, when he was replaced by François-Marie Le Marchand de Lignery.

Operation

One of four forts built by the French and Canadiens, to control the Venango Path between Lake Erie and the Ohio River, Fort Machault was located in modern Franklin, Pennsylvania, at the confluence of French Creek and the Allegheny River. Fort Machault was the last stop on the supply route from New France or Quebec, before Fort Duquesne, at the Forks of the Ohio. 

Prior to the arrival of the French in 1753, John Fraser, a Scots immigrant, blacksmith, and trader from Pennsylvania, had set up shop on this site. He supplied Indians in the region with trade goods and repaired their guns and other metal wares. His business was an example of the western expansion of Pennsylvania's fur trade that prompted the French to fortify the Ohio Country, for fear of losing their trade and influence among the Indians there.

In December 1753, Major George Washington of the Virginia militia used the Venango Path to reach Fort Machault during his first expedition into the Ohio Country.  Washington, with an escort of seven men and a letter from Governor Robert Dinwiddie of Virginia, protested the French invasion of lands claimed by Great Britain and demanded their immediate withdrawal. Joncaire directed Washington to his superior officer at Fort LeBoeuf, where he went next. At dinner before Washington departed, Joncaire informed the British colonist about French intentions to "take possession of the Ohio".

In 1756, William Johnson, who had escaped from Native Americans, described the fort as a "Captain's command of about 50 men; the Fort of Stockades, very weak, and scarce of provisions . . . "

After abandoning Fort Duquesne in November 1758, the French fell back to Fort Machault. The British expected them to launch a counterattack from there in the following campaign season. In 1758, Colonel Mercer, in a report from Fort Pitt (the former Fort Duquesne), reported that there were about 100 soldiers at Fort Machault, where the French had 11 flat-bottomed boats called "batteaus" and a large gun the size of a quart pot "which they fire off by a train of powder."

In July 1759, the French began a campaign to retake Fort Pitt.  Nearly a thousand French and Canadiens and a thousand Native Americans mustered at Fort Machault.  The British, however, began a siege of the French Fort Niagara. On July 25, 1759, the French surrendered Fort Niagara. This made the French garrisons in the Ohio Country untenable.  They abandoned their assault on Fort Pitt and available forces were sent to attempt to relieve Fort Niagara.

In August 1759, the commander of Fort Presque Isle sent word to Fort Le Boeuf and Fort Machault to abandon their forts.  The French burned Fort Machault to the ground to prevent its use by the British; they retreated to Canada in anticipation of a British expedition north from the Forks of the Ohio. In 1760, the British built Fort Venango near the site of former Fort Machault. The present-day city of Franklin, Pennsylvania developed here.

References

Sources
 Albert, George Dallas. The Frontier Forts of Western Pennsylvania,  Harrisburg: C. M. Busch, state printer, 1896.  Description of the fort, pp. 585–590.  Location of the fort, p. 586, "On the present plan of the city of Franklin, Elk street passes through the site of the fort, whilst its southern side reaches nearly to Sixth street."

External links
 Google Earth indicates that this position is at 41.386117 -79.821679

Forts in Pennsylvania
Colonial forts in Pennsylvania
French and Indian War forts
Portages in the United States
Buildings and structures in Venango County, Pennsylvania
French forts in the United States